Frank Paschek (born 25 June 1956 in Bad Doberan, Bezirk Rostock) is a retired East German long jumper.

He won the silver medal for East Germany at the 1980 Summer Olympics held in Moscow, Soviet Union.

His personal best jump was 8.36 metres, achieved in May 1980 in Berlin. This ranks him fourth among German long jumpers, behind Lutz Dombrowski, Christian Reif and Sebastian Bayer.

References

1956 births
Living people
People from Bad Doberan
People from Bezirk Rostock
East German male long jumpers
Sportspeople from Mecklenburg-Western Pomerania
Olympic athletes of East Germany
Athletes (track and field) at the 1980 Summer Olympics
Olympic silver medalists for East Germany
Medalists at the 1980 Summer Olympics
Olympic silver medalists in athletics (track and field)
Recipients of the Patriotic Order of Merit in bronze